Phoenix Forgotten is a 2017 American found footage science-fiction horror film directed by Justin Barber in his directorial debut, and written by Barber and T.S. Nowlin. The film is also produced by Nowlin, alongside Ridley Scott, Wes Ball, Courtney Solomon and Mark Canton.

Originally advertised as Phoenix, the film tells the story of the disappearance of three teenagers who set out to find the source of the widely reported 1997 UFO phenomenon known as the "Phoenix Lights". It was released on April 21, 2017 to negative reviews, with many critics unfavorably comparing it to The Blair Witch Project.

Plot
Sophie Bishop and her boyfriend Dan visit Sophie's parents in Phoenix, Arizona on the 20th anniversary of her older brother Josh's disappearance. On March 13, 1997, the family witnesses the Phoenix Lights during Sophie's 6th birthday party, with Josh recording the incident. Several strange lights appear in a "V" formation over the city before disappearing, followed closely by fighter jets. Josh becomes convinced they have witnessed UFOs, though others remain skeptical. Hoping to find answers to her brother's fate, Sophie begins reviewing all of Josh's saved videotapes.

In the tapes, Josh begins investigating the Phoenix Lights with the help of his friends Ashley and Mark. Ashley and Josh interview two astronomers, who theorize that the lights were flares dropped by jets from the nearby Luke Air Force Base. However, Ashley and Josh remain unconvinced. Several days later, more mysterious lights appear over Mesa. Hoping to capture the lights on film and in better quality, Josh, Ashley, and Mark drive to Mesa. Upon arrival, the trio climb a hill on the outskirts of the town before noticing a spotlight in the distance facing sky-ward. Curious, the trio hike toward the spotlight where they find a gathering of Sheriff's Deputies and mysterious men. Josh notices the cars belonging to the men have no license plates. The group is then spotted by the men, forcing them to flee. The next day, Josh plots the apparent course of the lights, determining they will soon appear over an isolated area of the desert. In the present day, Sophie continues to interview multiple parties regarding the trio's disappearance. Only the group's abandoned car and a camera with single tape was discovered. Sophie views the recovered tape, showing the beginning of the group's journey to find the lights and discovering a charred animal corpse.

As the tape ends, Sophie refuses to believe Josh did not record the remainder of the trip. She concludes that Josh must have had a second camera. Sophie and Dan visit the local high school, where Ashley was a film editor and would have had access to such equipment. However the film teacher does not have any logs that may have been filled out, leaving Sophie at a dead end. Before departing Phoenix, she interviews her parents who reveal that the strain of Josh's disappearance caused them to divorce. The next night, Sophie receives a call from the teacher, who claims to have found something. She returns to Phoenix and receives a box that had been mailed to the school several years prior before being placed in storage. Sophie and Dan open the box and discover a heavily damaged camera. Dan manages to retrieve the tape from within the camera before watching it with Sophie.

The film then cuts to Sophie after having watched the tape, clearly distraught by its contents. She then contacts a Captain at Luke Air Force Base for an interview. Upon arrival however, the Captain appears confrontational with Sophie while Dan waits with the camera in the car. Sophie then returns and claims the Captain ordered her to "not let the footage get out". Dan asks Sophie what to do next, with Sophie giving him a look of determination. The film then cuts to the contents of the recovered tape, comprising the remainder of the film.

The last film begins moments after Josh, Ashley, and Mark find the charred corpse. The trio continues to hike through the desert and up a hill. Meanwhile, Ashley and Mark appear to grow closer, much to the disdain of Josh. After waiting at the top of a hill for several hours, the trio witness a single light in the distance. The light hovers for several minutes before accelerating along the horizon. The light grows progressively brighter and faster before discharging several, smaller lights. All the lights subsequently vanish. The trio celebrate their recording before hiking back to the vehicle. As night falls, the teens become lost and disoriented. Mark ventures up a hill alone to try and spot the car. After he leaves, Ashley and Josh hear a loud sound in the distance that appears to be getting closer. A bright light then appears behind the hill before passing over them. Mark returns, visibly distressed but apparently unharmed, claiming to have found the car. As they walk back, Mark refuses to disclose what he saw at the top of the hill. The trio then find the car and attempt to return home.

As they drive, the light appears behind the car and pursues them. They attempt to flee before the light disables the car and vanishes. Unable to fix the vehicle, the trio hike along the road attempting to get back to town. As they walk, Mark begins showing severe symptoms of an unknown illness, including a nosebleed, fever, and disorientation. Mark then claims to hear voices, before running out into the desert while claiming to see his brother. As Ashley and Josh run after him, the light returns and Mark vanishes without a trace. Ashley begins to panic, while Josh comforts her. The two then notice a house light in the distance and resolve to follow it. Along the way, the two discover more charred animal corpses. In addition, Ashley also begins to show similar symptoms as Mark, including her hair falling out.

Continuing on, Ashley begins to hear an unknown sound. She then claims to see her father in the distance before running off with Josh following her. As they run, the light returns, causing lightning and high winds around them. Josh then captures the source of the light, revealed to be an alien craft appearing as several concentric, rotating rings. Josh then witnesses Ashley being lifted off the ground before being abducted in a flash of light. The tape then cuts to Josh arriving at the deserted home, still pursued by the alien craft. He attempts to hide inside the house. Meanwhile, the craft causes various appliances to explode and gravitational distortion. Josh begins to scream as the craft removes the roof of the house, then also quickly lifts him off the ground in a flash before the camera cuts out. The tape resumes as the camera catches a brief glimpse of space, before falling back down to Earth. The camera lands, recording the sunset for several minutes before dying as the credits roll. The closing captions indicate that the government denies any connections between the Phoenix Lights and the trio's disappearance.

Cast
Chelsea Lopez as Ashley
Florence Hartigan as Sophie
Justin Matthews as Mark
Luke Spencer Roberts as Josh

Release
In the United States and Canada, Phoenix Forgotten opened on April 21, 2017 alongside The Promise, Born in China, Free Fire and Unforgettable, and it was projected to gross around $2 million from 1,588 theaters in its opening weekend. It grossed $1.8 million in its opening weekend, finishing 11th at the box office.

Critical response
On review aggregator website Rotten Tomatoes, the film has an approval rating of 44% based on 16 reviews, with an average rating of 5.1/10. On Metacritic the film has a score of 33 out of 100, based on 5 critics, indicating "generally unfavorable reviews". Audiences polled by CinemaScore gave the film an average grade of "C−" on an A+ to F scale.

References

External links
Official website

2017 films
2017 horror films
American science fiction horror films
Found footage films
2010s science fiction horror films
Films set in Phoenix, Arizona
Films set in Maricopa County, Arizona
Scott Free Productions films
2010s English-language films
2010s American films